Russian Spy Camera is an American rock band from Athens, Georgia. They formed in 2005 by Ryan White and Andy Turner, later adding McGregor Button in 2006.

They recorded two albums: one for Happy Happy Birthday To Me Records titled You Are A Vulture (2006) and one independently called Mutiny In the Kitchen With Knives (2008).

References

External links 
 Happy Happy Birthday To Me Records official site

Rock music groups from Georgia (U.S. state)
Musical groups from Athens, Georgia
Musical groups established in 2005
2005 establishments in Georgia (U.S. state)